Assyrians in New Zealand are New Zealanders of Assyrian descent or Assyrians who have New Zealand citizenship. The Assyrian community in NZ began in the 1990s when refugees from Iraq and Iran settled in the country.

The majority of Assyrian New Zealanders live in Auckland in Suburbs of Manurewa and Papatoetoe, They have a Assyrian church of the east and Chaldean Catholic Church. Wellington has a sizeable Assyrian population consisting of several hundred people, Communities can be found in Miramar, Newtown, Strathmore, Island bay area.

History

In 2018, the Assyrian community of New Zealand unveiled a monument at Makara Cemetery in Wellington to immortalize the souls of the Assyrian martyrs in the WW1 Assyrian genocide. 

The Holy Cross Primary School in Wellington began teaching about Assyrian New Year as a subject through the Intensive Oral Language Program, where students learn about Assyrian culture, language and heritage.

Religion

Majority of Assyrians in New Zealand adhere to churches of the Syriac Christian tradition. These churches include the: Chaldean Catholic Church, Assyrian Church of the East, Ancient Church of the East and the Syriac Orthodox Church.

Demographics

According to the 2013 Census: 
58.1% of Assyrians in New Zealand lived in the Wellington Basin
The median age was 33.7 years
22.1 percent were born in New Zealand and 77.7 percent were born overseas.

The statistic of the number of Assyrians in New Zealand may be inaccurate as many Assyrians would identify as Iraqi or Middle Eastern before Assyrian when completing the Census.

References

External links
 Assyrian Church of the East Archdiocese of Australia, NZ and Lebanon
 Chaldean & Assyrian Catholic Diocese of Australia and NZ

Assyrian ethnic groups
Assyrian diaspora
Ethnic groups in New Zealand